Voshmgir District is a district (bakhsh) in Aqqala County, Golestan Province, Iran. At the 2006 census, its population was 25,149, in 5,266 families.  The District has one city: Anbar Olum.  The District has two rural districts (dehestan): Mazraeh-ye Jonubi Rural District and Mazraeh-ye Shomali Rural District.

References 

Districts of Golestan Province
Aqqala County